František Marek can refer to:

 František Marek (architect) (1899-1971), Czech architect
 František Marek (hurdler), Czech Olympic hurdler